opened in Hakodate, Hokkaidō, Japan in 1986.

See also
 Hakodate City Museum
 Hakodate City Museum of Literature
 Hakodate City Museum of Northern Peoples
 Hakodate Jōmon Culture Center
 Goryōkaku

References

External links

 Hakodate Museum of Art, Hokkaido

Museums in Hakodate
Art museums and galleries in Hokkaido
1986 establishments in Japan
Museums established in 1986